Melampodium divaricatum, also known by its common name gold medallion is a species of flowering plant from the genus Melampodium. The species was first described in 1836.

References

Millerieae
Plants described in 1836
Flora of Mexico
Flora of Brazil
Taxa named by Augustin Pyramus de Candolle